David Taylor Hill (born March 12, 1989) is an American former professional baseball pitcher. He played in Major League Baseball (MLB) for the Washington Nationals. In 2020, Hill joined the Toronto Blue Jays organization as a coach.

Playing career

Amateur
A native of Nashville, Tennessee, Hill attended Mount Juliet High School and played college baseball at Vanderbilt University. In 2009, he played collegiate summer baseball with the Chatham Anglers of the Cape Cod Baseball League. He was drafted by the Cleveland Indians in the 30th round of the 2010 MLB Draft, but did not sign and returned to Vanderbilt for his senior season. He was then drafted by the Washington Nationals in the sixth round of the 2011 MLB Draft.

Washington Nationals
Hill was called up to the majors for the first time on June 25, 2014. He elected free agency on November 6, 2017. On January 13, 2018, Hill resigned a minor league deal with the Washington Nationals.  He was released on March 28, 2018.

San Francisco Giants
On May 27, 2018, Hill signed a minor league deal with the San Francisco Giants and was assigned to AA. He became a free agent after the season.

Sioux Falls Canaries
On March 6, 2019, Hill signed with the Sioux Falls Canaries of the American Association.

Generales de Durango
On July 27, 2019, Hill's contract was purchased by the Generales de Durango of the Mexican League. Hill was released by the Generales on January 30, 2020.

Coaching
In January 2020, Hill joined the Toronto Blue Jays organization as the development coach for the Advanced-A Dunedin Blue Jays.

References

External links

Vanderbilt Commodores bio

1989 births
Living people
Washington Nationals players
Vanderbilt Commodores baseball players
Chatham Anglers players
Auburn Doubledays players
Hagerstown Suns players
Potomac Nationals players
Harrisburg Senators players
Syracuse Chiefs players
Richmond Flying Squirrels players
Sacramento River Cats players
Sioux Falls Canaries players
American expatriate baseball players in Mexico
Generales de Durango players
Baseball players from Nashville, Tennessee
Major League Baseball pitchers
People from Old Hickory, Tennessee